Zhou Huaren (Pinyin:Zhōu Huàrén; Wade–Giles:Chou Hua-jen) (1903 – 1976) was a politician in the Republic of China. He was an important politician during the Wang Jingwei regime. He was born in Huazhou, Guangdong.

Biography 
In 1925, Zhou Huaren entered the University of China in Beijing. In 1929 he entered Beiping University (now, Peking University), where he studied under Gu Mengyu a leader of the Kuomintang's Leftists. Gu introduced Zhou to Wang Jingwei, and in 1933 Zhou was appointed Vice-Chief of the Management Bureau for Jinpu railway on Wang's recommendation. In 1935 Zhou went to the United Kingdom and studied at London University.

In September 1939, Zhou Huaren became involved in Wang Jingwei's faction, and was appointed  Vice-Chief of the Bureau for Organization, Kuomintang (Wang's clique). He attended political planning sessions in Beiping (Peking), Shanghai and Hong Kong. In March 1940, the Wang Jingwei Regime was established, with Zhou appointed as the Executive Vice-Minister for Railways.

In the following October, Zhou Huaren was appointed as a  Member of the Committee for the Guangdong Provincial Government and the Mayor of Guangzhou Special Municipality. He served in this position until June 1942. In January 1943, he was appointed a Member of the National Economic Committee. In the following July, he was transferred to the Administrative Superintendency of the 1st District in Shanghai Special Municipality.

Just before the collapse of the Wang Jingwei Regime, Zhou Huaren escaped to Jilin. After the Wang Jingwei regime had collapsed, he was arrested by Chiang Kai-shek's National Government, and was imprisoned at Shanghai. But for some reason, he was released and fled to Hong Kong.

In 1976, Zhou Huaren died from an unknown illness in Hong Kong.

References

Footnotes 

 
  History of Prison in Shanghai The Office of Shanghai’s History (上海地方志办公室) Website
 
 

Politicians from Maoming
Republic of China politicians from Guangdong
Chinese collaborators with Imperial Japan
Kuomintang collaborators with Imperial Japan
1903 births
1976 deaths
Mayors of Guangzhou